Dmitry Olegovich Ternovsky (born 28 September 1994) is a Russian football goalkeeper. He plays for Dynamo Makhachkala.

Club career
He made his debut in the Russian Second Division for FC Fakel Voronezh on 16 July 2012 in a game against FC Vityaz Podolsk.

He made his Russian Football National League debut for Fakel on 4 October 2015 in a game against FC KAMAZ Naberezhnye Chelny.

References

External links
 
 

1994 births
Footballers from Voronezh
Living people
Russian footballers
Association football goalkeepers
FC Fakel Voronezh players
FC Volgar Astrakhan players
FC Urozhay Krasnodar players
FC Rotor Volgograd players
FC Olimp-Dolgoprudny players
FC Dynamo Makhachkala players
Russian First League players
Russian Second League players